Gregory Gabadadze is a physicist of Georgian origin. He is a professor of physics and dean for science at New York University, where he  served previously as chair of the Department of Physics and as the director of the Center for Cosmology and Particle Physics.

He received  pre-college training in physics  and mathematics in Tbilisi, a college degree from Moscow State University,  and a PhD  from Rutgers  University.

He is known for  the Dvali-Gabadadze-Porrati  brane-world model,  and for the de Rham-Gabadadze-Tolley theory of massive gravity.

In 2022, Gabadadze controversially fired NYU chemistry professor Maitland Jones Jr. after students complained that Jones's organic chemistry class was too hard. Jones's colleagues objected that Gabadadze set "a precedent, completely lacking in due process, that could undermine faculty freedoms and correspondingly enfeeble proven pedagogic practices.” In the same article, NYU spokesman John Beckman noted Jones's course evaluations “were by far the worst, not only among members of the chemistry department, but among all the university’s undergraduate science courses" and that the professor had received many student complaints about his “dismissiveness, unresponsiveness, condescension and opacity about grading.”

Partial bibliography
"4-D gravity on a brane in 5-D Minkowski space",  G.R. Dvali, Gregory Gabadadze, Massimo Porrati Published in Phys.Lett. B485 (2000) 208-214  e-Print: hep-th/0005016
"Generalization of the Fierz-Pauli Action", Claudia de Rham, Gregory Gabadadze  Published in Phys. Rev. D82 (2010) 044020  e-Print:  [hep-th]
"Resummation of Massive Gravity" Claudia de Rham, Gregory Gabadadze, Andrew J. Tolley.  Published in Phys. Rev. Lett. 106 (2011) 231101  e-Print:  [hep-th]

Reference list 

Georgian emigrants to the United States
Living people
Moscow State University alumni
New York University faculty
Physicists from Georgia (country)
Place of birth missing (living people)
Rutgers University alumni
Year of birth missing (living people)